Rossiya Tournament 1974 was played in Arkhangelsk on 25–27 January 1974. It was the second time the Rossiya Tournament was arranged. Sweden won the tournament.

The tournament was decided by round-robin results like a group stage.

Results

Sources
 https://fi.wikipedia.org/w/index.php?title=Rossija-turnaus_1974&oldid=13510566
 Norges herrlandskamper i bandy

1974 in Soviet sport
1974 in bandy
1974